Saint-Louis Suns United, is a football club based in Victoria, Seychelles. The club was formed as the result of a 2007 merger between Saint-Louis (founded in 1985) and Sunshine (1993).

History
Saint Louis Suns United was founded on 2007 after merger with Saint-Louis FC (established on the 1970s) and Sunshine SC (established on 1993).

Saint Louis won 13 Division One League titles between 1979 and 1994, and made several appearances in continental competitions. Sunshine won its first in 1995, after only two years in existence. The following year Sunshine made its debut in international competition as it represented Seychelles in the African Cup of Champions Clubs.  From its foundation the team has kept on playing in the top division.

Achievements
 Seychelles League: 15
 1979, 1980, 1981, 1983, 1985, 1986, 1987, 1988, 1989, 1990, 1991, 1992, 1994
 1995 (as Sunshine SC)
 2017 (as Saint Louis Suns United)

 Seychelles FA Cup: 5
 1988, 2003 (as Saint-Louis FC)
 2000 (as Sunshine SC)
 2010, 2017 (as Saint Louis Suns United)

 Seychelles Presidents Cup: 2
 2003 (as Saint-Louis FC)
 2008 (as Saint Louis Suns United)

Performance in CAF competitions
 African Cup of Champions Clubs: 5 appearances
1989: First Round
1990: First Round
1991: Preliminary Round
1992: Preliminary Round
1996: Preliminary Round

 CAF Confederation Cup: 1 appearance
2004 – Preliminary Round

 African Cup Winners' Cup: 2 appearances
1998: Preliminary Round
2001: Second Round

References

External links
Saint Louis Suns United at Playmaker Stats

Football clubs in Seychelles
Association football clubs established in 2007
2007 establishments in Seychelles